Arner is a surname. Notable people with the surname include:

Elias Arnér (born 1966), Swedish biochemist
Gwen Arner, American television director and actress
James G. Arner (born 1951), American judge
Sivar Arnér (1909–1997), Swedish writer and playwright

See also
Louise Arner Boyd (1887–1972), American explorer